Ratomir Čabrić (Serbian Cyrillic: Ратомир Чабрић; 19 September 1918 – 13 April 1990) was a Serbian football player and coach.

Career

Playing career
Čabrić, who played as a striker, spent his professional career in Yugoslavia, playing for FK BASK and SK Jugoslavija.

Čabrić also represented Yugoslavia once at international level.

Coaching career
Čabrić managed FK Velež Mostar, FK Vojvodina, Iraklis Thessaloniki and FK Radnički Niš.

References

1918 births
1990 deaths
Association football forwards
Serbian footballers
Yugoslav footballers
Yugoslavia international footballers
FK BASK players
SK Jugoslavija players
Serbian football managers
Yugoslav football managers
FK Vojvodina managers
FK Velež Mostar managers
Iraklis Thessaloniki F.C. managers
FK Radnički Niš managers
HNK Rijeka managers
FK Sarajevo managers
FK Sutjeska Nikšić managers